Aeolesthes is a genus of beetles belonging to the family Cerambycidae.

The species of this genus are found in Southeastern Asia and Australia.

Species
Species in the genus include:

Aeolesthes achilles 
Aeolesthes ampliata 
Aeolesthes aureopilosa 
Aeolesthes aurifaber 
Aeolesthes chrysophanes 
Aeolesthes curticornis 
Aeolesthes holosericea 
Aeolesthes induta 
Aeolesthes laosensis  
Aeolesthes mariae 
Aeolesthes ningshanensis 
Aeolesthes nishikawai 
Aeolesthes pericalles 
Aeolesthes psednothrix 
Aeolesthes rufimembris 
Aeolesthes sarta 
Aeolesthes sinensis 
Aeolesthes  sticheri 

The species Aeolesthes aurosignatus has been transferred to the genus Pseudaeolesthes.

References

Cerambycini
Cerambycidae genera